Jason Villegas (born August 16, 1977 in Houston, TX) is currently a San Francisco based contemporary artist.  He has exhibited across the United States and internationally.  Villegas' work utilizes a wide spectrum of mediums including sculpture, installation, painting, drawing, textile, video and performance.  He has created his own artistic realm and visual language in which to explore concepts such as globalism, evolution, sexuality, cosmology, and consumerism.  Motifs in Villegas' artworks include fashion logos, animal hybrids, weaponry, sales banners, clothing piles, anuses, cosmic debris, taxidermy, bear men, amorphous beasts, religious iconography, and party scenarios.

Phantom Sightings
Jason Villegas was a part of the traveling group exhibition Phantom Sightings: Art After the Chicano Movement, curated by Rita Gonzales, Howard Fox, and Chen Noriega.  Beginning at the Los Angeles County Museum of Art (LACMA) in 2008, the exhibit toured for two years including renowned spaces such as, the Tamayo Museum in Mexico City, El Museo del Barrio in New York City, the Phoenix Art Museum (PAM) in Arizona,  Museo de Arte de Zappopan in Guadalajara, and the Museo Alameda in San Antonio.  His selected work "Celestial Situation" (2006) featured a wall mural of painting and drawing depicting planetary spheres of cosmic clutter involving a video projection of animated 2D artworks onto a drawing of compressed entertainment electronics and media.  The animation reveals a consumption cosmology of anuses, amorphous beasts, and a rotund man watching television.

Curriculum Vitae

Solo exhibitions

"Perspectives: 167" Contemporary Arts Museum Houston, TX (2009)	
"Botched Simulacrum"  McClain Gallery  Houston, TX (2009)
"Hunter Gatherer"   Receiver Gallery   San Francisco, CA (2008)	
"Cosmic Slut"  Gescheidle  Chicago, IL (2008)
"Impish Animal"  Okay Mountain   Austin, TX (2008)
"G*D"  Project Gallery  New Brunswick, NJ (2007)
"Forever Developing Shrine" Plush  Dallas, TX (2006)	
"Repressed Burial Fantasy"  Okay Mountain  Austin, TX (2006)
"Ultrabastard: marketing seminar"  Cactus Bra Space  San Antonio, TX (2005)	
"Absolute Destiny Apocalypse"  Deborah Colton Gallery  Houston, TX (2005)
"Growth Hormone Mutation Make-Over"  Plush  Dallas, TX (2005)
"Beast Taxidermy"  CSAW   Houston, TX (2004)
"Romantic Poverty & Hunger Pains"  Montgomery College  Conroe, TX (2004)

Group exhibitions

"Dissolution" Leslie Lohman Museum of Queer Art, NY, NY (2021)
"Omniscient: Queer Documentation in an Image Culture" Leslie Lohman Museum of Queer Art, NY, NY (2021)
"Flamecon" Sheraton Times Square, NY, NY (2019)
"The Alchemical Trace" Sanitary Tortilla Factory, Albuquerque, NM (2017)
"Salon Style" Zoya Tommy Gallery, Houston, TX (2014)
"Flatland" Guadalupe Cultural Arts Center, San Antonio, TX (2014) 
"Summer School" Liliana Bloch Gallery, Dallas, TX (2013)
"Aqua Art Fair" Plush Gallery, Miami, Fl (2012)
"Permanent Collection Exhibit"  Tijuana US Consulate, MEXICO (2011) 

"Joni"  Kathleen Cullen Gallery, NYC, NY (2010)
"Emerging Artist Fellowship"  Socrates Sculpture Park, Long Island City, NY (2010)
"Head and Pole"  Western Exhibitions Chicago, IL (2010)
"Global National"  Exit Art  NYC, NY (2010)
"Phantom Sightings: Art After the Chicano Movement"  El Museo del Barrio, NYC (2010)
"Aparaciones Fantasmales"  Museo de Arte de Zappopan, Guadalajara, MX (2009)		
"Phantom Sightings: Art After the Chicano Movement"  Phoenix Art Museum AZ (2009)
"Phantom Sightings: Art After the Chicano Movement" Alameda Museum  San Antonio, TX (2009)
"Aparaciones Fantasmales" Museo Ruffino Tamayo, Mexico City (2008)	
"Phantom Sightings: Art After the Chicano Movement"  LACMA Los Angeles, CA (2008)	
"Children in Heat Lawndale Art Center"  Houston, TX 2007  Art Club Gescheidle  Chicago, IL (2008)
"The Paul Nudd Curatorial Experience" Western Exhibitions Chicago, IL (2008)	
"Eyes Wide Open" El Museo Del Barrio / The Armory  New York, NY (2008)
"The Dams 2 / Las Represas" Universidad del Sagrado Corazón Puerto Rico (2008) 	
"Object"  UT at Dallas, TX 2006  Manic & Wasted  Swing Space NYC, NY (2008)	
"Debut"  The Texas Firehouse  LIC, NY (2008)	
"Stop Trashing Houston"  Versionfest Chicago, IL (2008)	
"La Frontera"  Gescheidle  Chicago, IL (2008)
"Young Latino Artists #10" Mexic Arte Museum Austin, TX (2005)
"Artadia Houston"  Diverseworks   Houston, TX (2005)	
"I-10 a Postmodern Route 66"  McClain Gallery  Houston, TX (2005)	
"New Cartoon"  Deborah Colton Gallery  Houston, TX (2005)	
"Woods"  Negative Space  Houston, TX (2005)
"Temporary Contemporary"  The Orange Show  Houston, TX (2004)	
"Sloppy Slobbering Monster"  The Bank  Kansas City, MO (2004)	
"In Situ"  Allen's Landing  Houston, TX (2004)	
"Camp Lucky Summer of Carnage"  Deborah Colton Gallery  Houston, TX (2004)	
"Brothers"  Fresh up Club Austin, TX (2004)	
"New American Talent 19"  ArtHouse  Austin, TX (2004)
"Brave New World"   McClain Gallery   Houston, TX (2004)
"Animals"  ArtCar Museum  Houston, TX (2003)	
"The Big Show"   Lawndale Art Center  Houston, TX (2003)  	
"Dallas vs. Houston"   Plush Gallery  Dallas, TX (2003)
"Trailer Park"  Deer Park, TX (2003)
"The Big Show"   Lawndale Art Center   Houston, TX (2002)
"Friendly Mart"   Quick Stop  Houston, TX (2001)

Education
Villegas earned his MFA in 2007 at the Mason Gross School of Art at Rutgers University in New Brunswick, NJ and his BFA in 2003 at the University of Houston in Texas.

Awards

Leslie Lohman Museum of Queer Art, Artist Fellowship (2019)
Lower Manhattan Cultural Council, Workspace Studio (2010)
Socrates Sculpture Park, Emerging Artist Fellowship (2010)
Vermont Studio Center, Nadine Goldsmith Fellowship (2007)
Artadia Houston, Grant Finalist (2004)

Publications

Glasstire: Texas Visual Art Online  "Salon Style" by Bill Davenport, February (2014) 

Boro Magazine "Art Imitates Life" (2011)

ArtLies January (2010)

OutSmart  "It's All About Identity" by Rich Arenschieldt, September (2009) 
Houston Chronicle  "Jason Villegas casts animal logos as invasive species" by Douglas Britt, August (2009)
Houston Press  "Perspectives 167: Jason Villegas" by D.L. Groover, October (2009)
Houston Press   "Polo by Jason Villegas" by Kelly Klassmeyer, October (2009)

LACMA  Phantom Sightings: Art After The Chicano Movement exhibition catalog by Howard Fox, Rita Fox (2008)
LA Times Phantom Sightings: Art After The Chicano Movement (2008) 

Art in America  "Jason Villegas at Dallas" by Charles Dee Mitchell, May (2007) 

Cantanker Magazine  “Okay Mountain: Jason Villegas” by Cherie Weaver, May (2006)

Glasstire: Texas Visual Art Online  "Tire Iron 52" by Bill Davenport, July (2005)
Austin American-Statesman  “An exhibition of latino art-whatever that may be”  by Jeanne Claire van Ryzia, August (2005)
Dallas Observer  “Growth Hormone Mutation Make-over”  by Charrissa N Terranova, February (2005)
Houston Press “New Cartoon”  by Kelly Klaasmeyer, March (2005)
Houston Press  “Woods” by Kelly Klaasmeyer, February (2005)

Glasstire: Texas Visual Art Online  "Best of 2004"  by Rachel Cook (2004)
New American Talent, The Nineteenth Exhibition,  Arthouse, Exhibition Catalog (2004)
Houston Press “Temporary Insanity”  by Steven Devedanam, November (2004)
Houston Press  “No Virgins, No Velvet”   by Josh Harkinson, November (2004)
Houston Press  “New World Order”  by Steven Devedanam, May (2004)

Dallas Observer  “Urban Brawl, It’s Houston vs. Dallas”  by Annabelle Massey Helber, April (2003)

Houston Press  “The Biggest and the Baddest”  by Kelly Klaasmeyer, July (2002)

References

Living people
1977 births
Mason Gross School of the Arts alumni
University of Houston alumni